Ștefan Baștovoi (born 4 August 1976 in Chișinău), best known as Savatie Baștovoi is a Moldavian orthodox monk, essayist, poet, painter, novelist, theologian and Romanian writer of the Republic of Moldova. He became a member of the Writers' Union of Moldova in 1996. He was also a moderator of a television show.

Selected works
 Elefantul promis, (poem) (1996)
 Cartea războiului, (poem) (1997)
 Peştele pescar (o poveste), (poem) (1998)
 Casa timpului (poem) (1999) 
 Idol sau icoană? (2000)
 Ortodoxia pentru postmodernişti (with Nicolae Balotă, Andrei Kuraev and Dumitru Crudu)
 Iepurii nu mor, (novel) (2002; ed. a II-a, 2007)
 Nebunul, (novel) (2006)

Referenced criticism
 Mihai Cimpoi, O istorie deschisă a literaturii române din Basarabia, Ed. Porto-Franco, 1997 
 Mircea Cărtărescu, Postmodernismul românesc, Ed. Humanitas, 1999
 Ion Bogdan Lefter,  Scriitori români din anii '80–'90. Dicţionar bio-bibliografic, vol. I, Ed. Paralela 45, 2000

References

1976 births
Living people
Writers from Chișinău
Moldovan poets
Male poets
Moldovan male writers
Romanian poets
Romanian male poets